The North Dakota State Penitentiary is a part of the North Dakota Department of Corrections and Rehabilitation and is located in Bismarck, North Dakota.  As of January 2013 the prison population stood at a record level of 1,550 inmates.

Notable inmates 

 Mohamed Noor, former Minneapolis police officer

References

Prisons in North Dakota
Buildings and structures in Bismarck, North Dakota
1884 establishments in Dakota Territory